Dendrobrachiidae is a family of cnidarians belonging to the order Alcyonacea.

Genera:
 Dendrobrachia Brook, 1889

References

Holaxonia
Cnidarian families